Nigmatilla Tulkinovich Yuldashev (born 5 November 1962) is an Uzbek lawyer and politician who served as Chairman of the Senate of Uzbekistan from 2015 until 2019. Previously he was Minister of Justice from 2011 to 2015.

Biography
After graduating from the law department of Tashkent State University in 1985, Yuldashev joined the city prosecutor's office in Olmaliq. In 1991 he became an investigator in the Yunusabad District Prosecutor’s Office in Tashkent, later becoming a senior investigator and then a prosecutor in the Uzbekistan prosecutor’s office.

In 2000 he joined the General Prosecutor's Office as Head of Inspection of Internal Security, before becoming a member of staff in the President's office in 2003. In 2006 he was appointed as head of the Department of Tax and Money Laundering at the General Prosecutor's Office, and in 2008 he became Deputy Prosecutor General.

On 21 July 2011 he was appointed Minister of Justice as a result of presidential decree УП-4323. He served as a minister until being elected to the Senate in January 2015, after which he was elected Chairman of the Senate. 

Following the death of Islam Karimov, Uzbekistan's first president, on 2 September 2016, Yuldashev would have become acting President under the terms of the constitution. However, there was no official confirmation that he had taken up the post and, after a few days, he proposed that Prime Minister Shavkat Mirziyoyev (seen by observers as Karimov's likely successor) take the post instead, in light of the latter's "many years of experience", and Mirziyoyev was accordingly appointed as interim President by a joint session of both houses of parliament on 8 September 2016.

Upon leaving his post as Senate Chairman, Yuldashev was appointed to the post of General Prosecutor by President Mirziyoyev.

References

1962 births
Justice ministers of Uzbekistan
Living people
Members of the Supreme Assembly (Uzbekistan)
Members of the Senate of Uzbekistan
National University of Uzbekistan alumni
Politicians from Tashkent
Presidents of Uzbekistan
Uzbekistani lawyers